The Moore Automobile Company of New York City was the manufacturer of the Moore automobile, known as "The Ball Bearing Car".  The company was founded in 1906 with a factory in Bridgeport, Connecticut.  W. J. P. Moore and F. D. Howe designed a 40-hp four-cylinder with a manganese bronze crankcase and ball bearings used every where. The limousine was priced at $8,000, and did not survive two years.

Advertisements

References

Motor vehicle manufacturers based in New York (state)
Defunct motor vehicle manufacturers of the United States
Defunct companies based in New York (state)
Vehicle manufacturing companies established in 1906
1906 establishments in New York City
1909 disestablishments in New York (state)
Brass Era vehicles
1900s cars
Luxury vehicles
Luxury motor vehicle manufacturers
Vehicle manufacturing companies disestablished in 1907
Cars introduced in 1906
Motor vehicle manufacturers based in Connecticut